11 Corps, 11th Corps, Eleventh Corps, or XI Corps may refer to:

 11th Army Corps (France)
 XI Corps (Grande Armée), a unit of the Imperial French Army during the Napoleonic Wars
 XI Corps (German Empire), a unit of the Imperial German Army
 XI Army Corps (Wehrmacht), a unit of the Nazi German Army
 XI Corps (India)
 XI Army Corps (Italy)
 XI Corps (Ottoman Empire)
 11th Army Corps (Russian Empire)
 11th Army Corps (Russian Federation)
 XI Corps (Pakistan), a unit of the Pakistani Army
 XI Army Corps (Spain)
 XI Corps (United Kingdom), a unit of the British Army
 XI Corps (United States), a unit of the United States Army
 XI Corps (Union Army), a unit in the American Civil War

See also
 List of military corps by number
 11th Army (disambiguation)
 11th Division (disambiguation)
 11th Brigade (disambiguation)
 11th Regiment (disambiguation)
 11th Squadron (disambiguation)
 11th Battalion (disambiguation)